Big Brother VIP, is an adaptation of the Big Brother reality television series. It is the celebrity version of its parent franchise Big Brother, the celebrity version airs in several countries, however, the housemates or houseguests are local celebrities. The format of the celebrity version usually keeps the same as the original version. In some countries, the prize money normally awarded to the winning housemate is donated to a charity, and all celebrities are paid to appear in the show as long as they do not voluntarily leave before their eviction or the end of the series. The rest of the rules are nearly the same as those of the original version.

History
The first-ever celebrity version of Big Brother aired in Netherlands on 22 May 2000 with the name of Big Brother VIPs. It's a spin-off of the original Big Brother. The show was pre-recorded with four different groups of well-known Dutch celebrities (knowns as VIPs) entered the house. On 9 March 2001, UK broadcaster Channel 4 introduced their first celebrity series Celebrity Big Brother, making it the second country to adopt the celebrity version.

Popularity
The celebrity version has become particularly popular in the UK, causing UK broadcaster Channel 5 to extend its deal with Endemol enabling them to air two celebrity series in addition to the civilian version every year from 2012. In total, the UK aired 22 celebrity series with their twenty-second and final series ending on 10 September 2018, Four days later on 14 September 2018, Channel 5 confirmed that they had axed both Big Brother and Celebrity Big Brother.

In Bulgaria, VIP Brother has replaced the original format of the show and more seasons of the celebrity edition have been produced than the regular one. Due to the show's popularity there, it lasts for two months unlike most countries where it only airs for a month.

Versions
 Currently airing
 An upcoming season
 Status unknown
 No longer airing
 Original version

See also
 Big Brother (franchise)

References

 
Banijay franchises
Reality television series franchises